Thomas Onslow, 2nd Earl of Onslow (15 March 1754 – 22 February 1827) was an English nobleman and courtier who succeeded to his title in 1814. Originally the Honourable Tom Onslow, he was styled Viscount Cranley from 1801 to 1814. He died in 1827 at his seat, Clandon Park in Surrey.

Family
Onslow was born at Imber Court, Thames Ditton, Surrey, the eldest son of the then George Onslow, later the 1st Earl. and Henrietta Shelley, daughter of Sir John Shelley, 4th Baronet and his second wife Margaret Pelham.

On 30 December 1776, he married Arabella Mainwaring-Ellerker (d. 11 April 1782), by whom he had four children:
 Arthur George Onslow, 3rd Earl of Onslow (1777–1870)
 Thomas Cranley Onslow (1778–1861)
 Capt. & Lt-Col. Mainwaring Edward Onslow, Scots Fusilier Guards (2 October 1779 – 1861)
 Lady Elizabeth Harriet Onslow (d. 18 July 1824)

He subsequently married, on 13 February 1783, Charlotte Duncombe (d. 25 April 1819), née Hale, widow of Thomas Duncombe (d. 1779). They had one daughter:
 Lady Georgiana Charlotte Onslow (d. 15 May 1829)

Career

Parliament
Onslow entered the British House of Commons for Rye in 1775. In 1784, he left Rye and replaced his father's first cousin, Colonel Onslow, as MP for Guildford upon the retirement of the latter. He continued to represent that constituency until 1806, when he was replaced by his second son, Thomas Cranley.

A supporter of the Foxite Whigs, Onslow was, however, rarely active in the House of Commons, presenting a petition in 1781 on behalf of a "body of the innholders of England", complaining of the quartering of soldiers upon them. As an associate of the Prince Regent, he was sent to Mrs Fitzherbert to tell her that the Prince had attempted suicide and only she could save his life, and he guarded the door of Fitzherbert's house when she secretly married the prince. However, he later fell out with the Prince, for reasons unknown, voting in favour of Pitt's regency proposal of 1789 and against the abolition of the slave trade in 1796.

Militia
He was appointed Colonel of the 1st Surrey Supplementary Militia (later 2nd Royal Surrey Militia) on 2 January 1797 on the recommendation of his father, who was Lord Lieutenant of Surrey. His son Arthur George Onslow was a lieutenant in the regiment. He resigned from the command in 1812 and handed it over to his second son, Thomas Cranley.

Sport

Cricket
Onslow was an amateur cricketer mainly associated with Surrey and he made 3 known appearances in first-class matches from 1801 to 1808.

Carriage driving

Onslow was an intimate of the Prince of Wales, and was known for his mania for driving four-in-hand. His phaeton, painted black and drawn by "four of the finest black horses in England", was thought by Gronow to have the appearance of an undertaker's carriage. He was the subject of numerous satirical verses on the subject, such as "What cam Tommy Onslow do/ he can drive a coach and two?/Can Tommy Onslow do more/Yes drive a coach and four".

Notes

References
 
 Burke's Peerage, Baronetage and Knightage, 100th Edn, London, 1953.
 Capt John Davis, Historical Records of the Second Royal Surrey or Eleventh Regiment of Militia, London: Marcus Ward, 1877.
 Gentleman's Magazine v.XCVII (Jan.–Jun. 1827) p. 269
 Arthur Haygarth, Scores & Biographies, Volume 1 (1744–1826), Lillywhite, 1862.

External sources
 CricketArchive record
 
 Queen's Royal Surreys

1754 births
1827 deaths
English cricketers
English cricketers of 1787 to 1825
Surrey cricketers
2
Onslow, Tom
Cranley, Thomas Onslow, Viscount
People from Thames Ditton
Cranley, Thomas Onslow, Viscount
Cranley, Thomas Onslow, Viscount
UK MPs who inherited peerages
Onslow, Thomas 2nd Earl of Onslow
Marylebone Cricket Club cricketers
British MPs 1774–1780
British MPs 1780–1784
British MPs 1784–1790
British MPs 1790–1796
British MPs 1796–1800
Surrey Militia officers